Estadio Revolución is located in zona 12 of Guatemala City on the campus of Universidad de San Carlos. Its capacity is 5,000 people and home to Universad de San Carlos (Guatemalan football club) that plays in the Liga Nacional de Fútbol.

Football venues in Guatemala City